Diamonds Are a Man's Best Friend is a 1966 Italian thriller-heist film written and directed by Vittorio Sala and starring Félix Marten, Liana Orfei and Gastone Moschin.

Plot
An adventurer steals a valuable diamond known as "Mountain of Light" from the museum. A band of gangsters gets on his trail to take his loot.

Cast 
 Félix Marten as Ray Master
 Liana Orfei as Françoise
 Gastone Moschin as Pete O'Connor
 Alan Collins as Max
 Seyna Seyn as Princess Ratana
 Attilio Dottesio

References

External links
 

1966 films
1960s crime thriller films
1960s heist films
Italian crime thriller films
Italian heist films
Films directed by Vittorio Sala
Films scored by Piero Umiliani
1960s Italian films